Techne is a term derived from Greek that is often translated as "craftsmanship", "craft", or "art".

Techne may also refer to:

 Bio-Techne Corporation, a biotechnology company whose former name was Techne Corporation
 Techné: Research in Philosophy and Technology, a journal
 Techne Ltd., an industrial equipment company that operated in the UK from 1948 to 2005